Sir Stephen Edmund Phillips (born 10 October 1961), styled The Rt. Hon. Lord Justice Phillips, is a judge of the Court of Appeal having previously served as a judge of the High Court of England and Wales.

He was educated at The King's School, Chester, and University College, Oxford.

He was called to the bar by Gray's Inn in 1984 and became a bencher there in 2006. He was made a QC in 2002, served as a deputy judge of the High Court from 2008 to 2013, and was appointed a judge of the High Court of Justice (Queen's Bench Division) in 2013, receiving the customary knighthood in the 2014 Special Honours. He was appointed a Lord Justice of Appeal on 13 January 2020 and sworn in as a member of the Privy Council of the United Kingdom.

References

1961 births
Living people
People educated at The King's School, Chester
Alumni of University College, Oxford
Members of Gray's Inn
British barristers
21st-century King's Counsel
Queen's Bench Division judges
Knights Bachelor
Members of the Privy Council of the United Kingdom